Molinella (Bolognese:  or ) is a comune (municipality) part of Metropolitan City of Bologna in the Italian region Emilia-Romagna, located about  northeast of Bologna.

Molinella borders the following municipalities: Argenta, Baricella, Budrio, Medicina.

Molinella is situated in a rural area on the old San Donato Road (which in the past connected Bologna with Argenta and its port on the Po di Primaro).  The municipality is crossed on the northern side by the Reno River and it is surrounded by several marshes and canals. 
The town has a railway station on the Bologna-Portomaggiore Railway.

History

The name Molinella comes from the Italian word for mill, molino; That is because during the Middle Ages there was a large number of watermills in this area. 
The village was created before the 14th century on a hillock between the marshes of Marmorta and Marrara and just south of the Po di Primaro river. The village was a "Customs place" on the border between Bologna Territory and Ferrara Territory until the 18th century. It was also one of the few accesses to the ferries which crossed the Po di Primaro.

It remained for long time one of the most isolated village in the province of Bologna. The construction of the railway in the 19th century was the first step for the development of the village, which is nowadays a little town with high standards of living.

Climate

On 12 January 1985, the official weather station of San Pietro Capofiume recorded the absolute low temperature of Italy for a lowland place: .

References

External links
 Official website
 

Cities and towns in Emilia-Romagna